Scythris reticulella is a moth of the family Scythrididae. It was described by Kari Nupponen in 2010. It is found in Uzbekistan. The habitat consists of alpine meadows.

The wingspan is 10.5-11.5 mm. The forewings are dark brown with a distinct pale brown streak in the fold from the base to 0.5, and a patch of the same colour at 0.75 in the midwing. There are a few pale brown scales in the apical area near the margins. The hindwings are dark fuscous. Adults have been recorded on wing in late July.

Etymology
The species name refers to shape of the valvae (resembling a tennis racket) and is derived from Latin reticulum (tennis racket).

References

reticulella
Moths described in 2010
Moths of Asia